Priobium is a genus of wood-boring, death-watch beetles ranging in western distribution in North America. Their antennae are without a distinct club. A pronotum similar to Hadrobregmus is characteristic. The various species appear similar. The larvae consume conifers.

Selected species
Priobium carpini (Herbst, 1793)
Priobium dendrobiiforme Reitter, 1901
Priobium mexicanum White, 1975
Priobium punctatum (LeConte, 1859)
Priobium sericeum (Say, 1825)

References

External links

Priobium at Fauna Europaea

Ptinidae